Miss Mabel Rebello (born 1950) is a politician from Indian National Congress party and a Member of the Parliament of India representing Jharkhand in the Rajya Sabha, the upper house of the Indian Parliament.

Reference list

External links
 Profile on Rajya Sabha website

Indian National Congress politicians
Living people
People from Udupi district
Rajya Sabha members from Madhya Pradesh
Rajya Sabha members from Jharkhand
1950 births
Indian National Congress politicians from Madhya Pradesh